Euchelus barbadensis is a species of sea snail, a marine gastropod mollusk in the family Chilodontidae.

Description
The height of the shell attains 9 mm.

Distribution
This species occurs at the Lesser Antilles off Barbados.

References

External links
 To Biodiversity Heritage Library (2 publications)
 To Encyclopedia of Life
 To USNM Invertebrate Zoology Mollusca Collection
 To World Register of Marine Species

barbadensis
Gastropods described in 1927